Joel Stowe (born May 10, 1955) is an American professional stock car racing driver. He competed in the NASCAR Winston Cup Series between 1980 and 1982, totaling four starts in the series.  He is from Waxhaw, North Carolina.

Racing career
Stowe made his NASCAR Winston Cup Series debut in 1980. He competed in a race at Dover International Speedway and finished 40 laps down in 18th, in between champion Richard Petty and longtime car owner James Hylton. After failing to qualify in the 1982 Daytona 500, Stowe participated in the consolation race and finished sixth, two laps down.

Motorsports career results

NASCAR
(key) (Bold – Pole position awarded by qualifying time. Italics – Pole position earned by points standings or practice time. * – Most laps led.)

Winston Cup Series

ARCA Talladega SuperCar Series
(key) (Bold – Pole position awarded by qualifying time. Italics – Pole position earned by points standings or practice time. * – Most laps led.)

References

External links
 The Life and Times of a Good Ol' Boy by Joel Stowe
 

Living people
1955 births
People from Waxhaw, North Carolina
Racing drivers from North Carolina
NASCAR drivers
ARCA Menards Series drivers